Ishee is a surname. Notable people with the surname include:

David M. Ishee (born 1963), American jurist
Roger Ishee (1930–2015), American petroleum engineer and politician
Thomas Ishee (born 1965), United States Navy rear admiral
Andrew Ishee, American pianist in The Kingsmen Quartet
Jeff Ishee, (born 1958) American farm broadcaster radio and television